Frederick John "Jack" Lewis (born 22 March 1948) is a former footballer who scored 99 goals from 412 appearances in the Football League playing for Lincoln City, Grimsby Town, Blackburn Rovers and Doncaster Rovers. He also played non-league football for Long Eaton United and Scarborough.

Lewis was selected in the Wales squad for their UEFA Euro 1976 qualifying match against Austria in November 1975, but did not play. He appeared as an over-age player for the Wales under-23 team in a 3–2 defeat to Scotland under-23s in February 1976.

References

1948 births
Living people
People from Long Eaton
Footballers from Derbyshire
English footballers
Welsh footballers
Wales under-23 international footballers
Association football forwards
Long Eaton United F.C. players
Lincoln City F.C. players
Grimsby Town F.C. players
Blackburn Rovers F.C. players
Doncaster Rovers F.C. players
Scarborough F.C. players
English Football League players
National League (English football) players
English people of Welsh descent